Tania Lynette Campbell (born 1967) is a South African Democratic Alliance politician who is serving as the Executive Mayor of the City of Ekurhuleni Metropolitan Municipality, as of 8 November 2022. She had previously served for 11 months from November 2021 until her removal in a motion of no confidence in October 2022.

Early life
Campbell attended Germiston Technical College. She went on to study human rights and executive municipal leadership with a focus on budgetary principles and performance management at the University of Pretoria.

Political career
Campbell joined the Democratic Alliance in 1997 and became a councillor in 2000 when the City of Ekurhuleni Metropolitan Municipality was established. She was elected as the ward Councillor for Ward 21 (Primrose) in 2006 and retained the ward in the 2011 elections. In 2013, she was elected chairperson of the DA caucus in the metro and was also appointed as DA Chief Whip in 2016. Ald Campbell also served  on numerous oversights in Ekurhuleni during her term of office. In October 2020, she was elected as DA caucus leader after the incumbent, Phillip de Lange, resigned after a motion of no confidence was brought against him by the caucus.

Mayor of Ekurhuleni

Election 
In the local elections held on 1 November 2021, no party obtained a majority of seats in the city council. The DA came in second with 28% of the vote behind the ANC with 38% of the vote. The DA mayoral candidate for the metro, Refiloe Nt'sekhe, withdrew her councillor candidacy on 8 November to instead continue serving as a member of the provincial legislature since she did not believe that she would be elected as Executive Mayor.

At the inaugural council meeting on 22 November, Raymond Dlamini of the DA was unexpectedly elected as speaker of the council with the help of smaller parties such as ActionSA and the Economic Freedom Fighters in a major upset. The DA then nominated Campbell as their candidate in the election for mayor against the incumbent Mzwandile Masina from the African National Congress (ANC). Campbell won with 116 votes over Masina's 105 votes, becoming the first DA member to serve as Executive Mayor of the metro. Campbell said in an interview with News24 that she was shocked that she was elected mayor and that her tenure as mayor would be "tough" as the DA does not hold a majority of seats in the council. She said in her inaugural address as mayor that she would be focusing on service delivery issues in the metro.

Tenure 

On 11 December 2021, Campbell announced her 10-member mayoral committee. A majority of the portfolios have DA MMCs, while ActionSA secured two portfolios and the Inkatha Freedom Party and the Congress of the People received one portfolio each. Campbell said that her mayoral committee will  begin to work to "charter a new path of renewed hope for the communities of Ekurhuleni". On 28 February 2022, Campbell reshuffled her mayoral committee to include two Patriotic Alliance councillors after the multi-party coalition signed a new agreement to bring the PA into the coalition.

On 2 March 2022, Campbell celebrated her first 100 days in office as mayor. She criticised the ANC's call for the City to write off 75% debt of all municipal accounts for households as "reckless" and "shortsighted" on 15 March. On 16 March, she denied ActionSA leader Herman Mashaba's claim that she had made a deal with the EFF that they would sit in on the panel that interviews head of departments and the city manager, in exchange for their support to pass the metro's adjustment budget in February.

On 26 October 2022, Campbell was voted out as mayor in an ANC-sponsored motion of no confidence. 100 councillors voted for her removal, while 93 voted against it. The Economic Freedom Fighters abstained from the vote.

On 8 November 2022 Campbell was voted back in as mayor of Ekurhuleni after attaining 124 of the 224 votes. 1 ballot was spoilt. Notably, the EFF had voted with DA and its coalition partners to re-elect her. Coalition talks between the ANC and EFF had failed to reach an agreement, with the ANC's provincial executive committee rejecting a proposal for the election of an EFF mayor in the metro, paving the way for Campbell to return as mayor.

Personal life
Campbell's sister is Michéle Clarke, who is a Member of Parliament for the DA and the party's spokesperson on health.

References

Living people
Place of birth missing (living people)
Democratic Alliance (South Africa) politicians
Mayors of places in South Africa
University of Pretoria alumni
White South African people
Mayors of Ekurhuleni
1963 births